Radio Rizzox is an album by Catarrhal Noise.

The song Bira Vin Wisky Graspa was later re-recorded in the album Te spùo so 'na recia.

Track listing
"Mussolino"
"Le scoasse"
"Cueo to mare"
"Tutti chiavano (ma io no)"
"Carne da macello"
"Musso"
"Caruba"
"Cuea"
"Bisime & basime"
"Rudi"
"Poppolo di Noal"
"Bira vin whisky graspa"
"A cagada"
"Cabernet Man"
"Coretto"

1997 albums
Catarrhal Noise albums